Calamine, also known as calamine lotion, is a medication used to treat mild itchiness made from powdered calamine mineral. This includes from sunburn, insect bites, poison ivy, poison oak, and other mild skin conditions. It may also help dry out skin irritation. It is applied on the skin as a cream or lotion.

Side effects may include skin irritation. It is considered to be safe in pregnancy. Calamine is a combination of zinc oxide and 0.5%  ferric oxide (Fe2O3). The lotion is produced with additional ingredients such as phenol and calcium hydroxide.

The use of calamine lotion dates back as far as 1500 BC. It is on the World Health Organization's List of Essential Medicines. Calamine is available over-the-counter as a generic medication.

Medical uses 
Calamine is used to treat itchiness. This includes sunburn, insect bite, or other mild skin conditions.

Effectiveness
The FDA recommends applying some topical over-the-counter skin products, such as calamine, to absorb the weeping of the skin caused by poisonous plants such as poison ivy, poison oak, and poison sumac. For relieving the pain or itching caused by these plants, the FDA document recommends a cold water compress and topical corticosteroids.

References

External links 
 

Antiseptics
Alchemical substances
Skin care
Antipruritics
World Health Organization essential medicines
Wikipedia medicine articles ready to translate
Combination drugs